The 2015 Akron Zips men's soccer team will represent The University of Akron during the 2015 NCAA Division I men's soccer season. It will be the 66th season of the university fielding a program. The Zips enter the season as the three-time defending MAC Men's Soccer Tournament champions. 

The Zips begin the season on August 28 at VCU, and conclude the season at home against Bowling Green.

2015 incoming team members

Schedule 

|-
!colspan=6 style="background:#C29C41; color:#000E41;"| Preseason
|-

|-
!colspan=6 style="background:#C29C41; color:#000E41;"| Regular season
|-

|-

|-

|-

|-

|-

|-

|-

|-

|-

|-

|-

|-

|-

|-

|-

|-

|-

|-
!colspan=6 style="background:#01A060; text:#002A5A;"| MAC Tournament
|-

|-

|-
!colspan=6 style="background:#007FFF; text:#ffffff;"| NCAA Tournament
|-

|-

|-

|-

|-

See also 

 Akron Zips men's soccer
 2015 Mid-American Conference men's soccer season
 2015 NCAA Division I men's soccer season
 2015 MAC Men's Soccer Tournament
 2015 NCAA Division I Men's Soccer Championship

References 

Akron Zips
Akron Zips men's soccer seasons
Akron Zips, Soccer
Akron Zips
NCAA Division I Men's Soccer Tournament College Cup seasons
Akron Zips